Ölgii may signify:

 Ölgii Uul, a mountain in the Tavan Bogd massif in the extreme west of Mongolia
 Bayan-Ölgii Province, an aimag of Mongolia
 Ölgii (city), the capital of Bayan-Ölgii aimag
 Ölgii Airport, the airport of Ölgii city
 Ölgii, Uvs, a sum (district) of Uvs aimag